Duboviazivka is an urban-type settlement in Konotop Raion of Sumy Oblast in Ukraine. It is located on the banks of the Lipka, a tributary of the Ezuch in the drainage basin of the Dnieper. Duboviazivka hosts the administration of Duboviazivka settlement hromada, one of the hromadas of Ukraine. Population:

Economy

Transportation
The settlement is connected by road with Sumy, Romny, and Konotop.

There is infrequent passenger traffic.

References

Urban-type settlements in Konotop Raion